Dendrolirium ornatum is a species of orchid. It is native to Thailand, Malaysia, Indonesia and the Philippines.

References

Orchids of Thailand
Orchids of Indonesia
Orchids of Malaysia
Orchids of the Philippines
Plants described in 1825
Eriinae